Mascías Cove is a cove indenting the west coast of Graham Land, Antarctica, immediately east of Mount Banck. It was first roughly charted by the Belgian Antarctic Expedition under Gerlache, 1897–99, and later, by the Scottish geologist David Ferguson, 1913–14. It was named for Lieutenant Eladio Mascías of the tug Chiriguano which made a survey of the area during the Argentine Antarctic Expedition of 1949–50.

References

Coves of Graham Land
Danco Coast